Çatalağzı  is a belde (town) in Zonguldak Province, Turkey

Geography

The town is a part of the central district of  Zonguldak. The town is situated in a valley which runs parallel to Black Sea coast. The population of the village is 8678  as of 2010.

History

The settlement was probably known as Psylla during the ancient times and Amastris, the daughter of Darius III of Achaemenid Empire lived around the settlement. After the Byzantine and Genoa colonial periods, the settlement was captured by the Ottoman Empire. In 1954 Çatalağzı was declared as a seat of township.

Living

There are coalfields around the town and like most other settlements around, Çatalağzı is a typical mining town. In 1948, the most powerful thermal power plant of Turkey in 1940s was put into use in Çatalağzı.

References

Populated places in Zonguldak Province
Towns in Turkey
Zonguldak Central District